I'm Married to a... is a reality television show on VH1. The pilot aired on October 17, 2012 and the series premiered on April 21, 2013.  The series features couples who are in unconventional marriages and relationships, including a transgender man and his girlfriend and a gay Mormon man married to a woman.

Episodes

References

External links 
 I'm Married to a...'s official site
 I'm Married to a...'s Facebook page
 
 

2010s American reality television series
2013 American television series debuts
2013 American television series endings
VH1 original programming